Shallow Bay, meaning a bay lacking depth, may refer to the following:

Shallow Bay (Newfoundland and Labrador), a bay on the Great Northern Peninsula
Shallow Bay on Sucia Island, Washington State, USA
Shallow Bay (Antarctica), in Mac. Robertson Land
Shallow Bay: The Best of Breaking Benjamin, a compilation album by American band Breaking Benjamin

See also
Echoes in a Shallow Bay, an EP by Scottish band Cocteau Twins